Altered is a 2006 American science fiction horror film directed by Eduardo Sánchez and written by Jamie Nash. It was Sánchez's first solo effort as director, following his co-directing of The Blair Witch Project in 1999.

The plot is an inversion of the standard alien abduction formula, as four men abduct a lone alien, planning to wreak revenge on the invading species. In its early stages, the film was entitled Probed, and was intended as a comic homage to the work of Sam Raimi and Troma Entertainment.

Plot
Altered is the story of four men who seek revenge on aliens, who abducted them and murdered their friend many years ago. As is explained via dialogue throughout the film, fifteen years before the events shown in the film, a group of five friends living in a remote American town were captured and experimented on by aliens while on a hunting trip. Only four of the friends returned alive.

The main character (Wyatt) has since distanced himself from his childhood friends and is shown to have decided to live with the past, albeit in apparent constant paranoia. Two of the remaining three characters, however, have been obsessed by revenge and have persuaded the remaining character that this is the correct course of action to take. The story opens with the tracking and subsequent capture of a lone alien—the consequences of which Wyatt and the three friends soon become deeply involved in.

Cast
 Paul McCarthy-Boyington as Cody
 Brad William Henke as Duke
 Michael C. Williams as Otis
 Adam Kaufman as Wyatt
 Catherine Mangan as Hope
 James Gammon as Sheriff Tom Herderson
 Joe Unger as Mr. Towne

Reception
Critical reception for Altered was mixed; Cinema Crazed gave the film a positive review, praising the "good old fashioned special effects mixed with wicked gore", while Reel Film was more ambivalent, suggesting that the film was "a little too talky for its own good, [but] practically a horror masterpiece when compared to some of its straight-to-video brethren." Roger Moore at the Orlando Sentinel was underwhelmed, reflecting that "too many of the arguments are whispered, too many settings are missing the horrific atmosphere the movie requires," and Scott Weinberg at DVD Talk described the film as "kind of a mixed bag: half chintzy and raw, half interesting and semi-creepy."

References

External links
 
 
 

2006 films
2006 horror films
2006 science fiction films
Direct-to-video horror films
2000s science fiction horror films
Alien abduction films
Films directed by Eduardo Sánchez (director)
American films about revenge
Films with screenplays by Eduardo Sánchez (director)
Films produced by Gregg Hale (producer)
Haxan Films films
2000s English-language films
2000s American films